The Aśvaka (Sanskrit: अश्वक), also known as the Ashvakan, Aśvakayana, or Asvayana and sometimes Latinised as Assacenii, Assacani, or Aspasioi, were a people who lived in what is now eastern Afghanistan and  northern Pakistan. The region in which they lived was also called Aśvaka.

Etymology 
The Sanskrit term aśva, Avestan aspa, and Prakrit assa means horse. The name Aśvaka/Aśvakan or Assaka is derived from the Sanskrit Aśva or Prakrit Assa and it denotes someone connected with the horses, hence a horseman, or a cavalryman or horse breeder. The Aśvakas were especially engaged in the occupation of breeding, raising and training war horses, as also in providing expert cavalry services.

The name of the Aśvakan or Assakan has been preserved in that of the modern Afghān.

According to philologist J.W. McCrindle, the name Aśvaka is also "distinctly preserved" in the name of the Esapzai (or Yusufzai) tribe of Pashtuns. McCrindle noted: "The name of the Aśvaka indicates that their country was renowned in primitive times, as it is at the present day, for its superior breed of horses. The fact that the Greeks translated their name into "Hippasioi" (from ἵππος, a horse) shows that they must have been aware of its etymological signification."

Ethnology 
Ancient Greek historians who documented the exploits of Alexander the Great refer to the Aspasioi and Assakenoi (Ἀσσακηνοί) tribes among his opponents. The historian Ramesh Chandra Majumdar has said that these words are probably corruptions of Aśvaka. It is possible that the corruption of the names occurred due to regional differences in pronunciation. Rama Shankar Tripathi thinks it possible that the Assakenoi were either allied to or a branch of the Aspasioi. The Greeks recorded the two groups as inhabiting different areas, with the Aspasioi in either the Alishang or Kunar Valley and the Assakenoi in the Swat Valley.

The Aśvaka may have been a sub-group of the Kamboja tribe that is referenced in ancient Sanskrit and Pali literature, such as the Mahabharata and Puranas, and which were partitioned into eastern and western Aśvakas. Barbara West treats the ethnonyms Kamboja, Aśvaka, Aspasioi, Assakenoi and Asvakayana as synonyms.

History 
The Assakenoi fielded 2,000 cavalry, 30 elephants and 30,000 infantry against Alexander during his campaign in India, which began in 327 BCE, but they eventually had to surrender after losses at places such as Beira, Massaga and Ora. The Aspasioi chose to flee into the hills but destroyed their city of Arigaion before doing so; 40,000 of them were captured, along with 230,000 oxen. Diodorus recorded the strength of the Aśvaka opposition, noting that the women took up arms along with the men, preferring "a glorious death to a life of dishonour". Queen Cleophis was the main leader of Ashvaka during their war against Alexander.

The Asvayanas have been attested to be good cattle breeders and agriculturists by classical writers. Arrian said that, during the time of Alexander, there were a large number of bullocks - 230,000 - of a size and shape superior to what the Macedonians had known, which Alexander captured from them and decided to send to Macedonia for agriculture.

References 
Notes

Citations

Further reading 

 Geographical Data in Early Puranas, A Critical Study, 1972, p 179 Dr M. R. Singh
 Dictionary of Greek & Roman Geography, Vol-I, 1966, William Smith, Phillip Smith
 Geographical Dictionary of ancient and Medieval India, Dr Nundo Lal Dey
 Itihaas Parvesh (Hindi), 1948, Dr Jaychandra Vidyalankar
 Historie du bouddhisme Indien, p 110, Dr E. Lammotte
 Raja Poros, 1990, Publication Buareau, Punjabi University, Patiala
 History of Poros, 1967, pp 12,39, Dr Buddha Prakash

Kambojas
Ancient peoples of Pakistan